The England A cricket team toured Bangladesh in the 1999–2000 season and played five first-class matches including three against the Bangladesh national team.

The England A team was captained by Mark Alleyne and included well-known players like Marcus Trescothick, IanWard, James Kirtley, Vikram Solanki, Paul Franks and Alamgir Sheriyar.

The first and third matches against Bangladesh were drawn but England A won the second by 5 wickets.

References
 Wisden Cricketers Almanack

External links
 CricketArchive

1999 in English cricket
2000 in English cricket
1999 in Bangladeshi cricket
2000 in Bangladeshi cricket
International cricket competitions from 1997–98 to 2000
English cricket tours of Bangladesh
Bangladeshi cricket in the 20th century